Pascal Aka (born in Ivory Coast, July 17, 1985) is an Ivorian film director, actor, music video director and producer, very well known for his work on  "Jamie and Eddie: Souls of Strife (2007)",  "Evol (2010)",Double-Cross which got several nominations at the Ghana Movies Award 2014.

Early career 

Born in Abidjan, Ivory Coast, Pascal Aka grew up in Ghana. He attended Ontario based University of Carleton where he studied " film studies program" and a former trainee at the Independent Filmmaker's Cooperative of Ottawa, at which he served as the Director's General, Chairman of the Diversity Committee and Vice President. He produced his debut movie "Jamie and Eddie: Souls of Strife" which he produced, directed and co-starred at age 21. After 9 years in Canada, Pascal returned to Ghana and started his own production company called "Breakthrough Media Productions".

Filmography

Awards and recognition

References

External links
 
Pascal Aka Youtube Page
Pascal Aka Vimeo Page

Living people
1985 births
Ivorian male actors
Ivorian film directors
Ivorian film producers
Ivorian writers